Vishal Sharma may refer to:

 Vishal Sharma (Delhi cricketer) (born 1978), Indian cricketer
 Vishal Sharma (Hyderabad cricketer) (born 1987), Indian cricketer
 Vishal Sharma (Railways cricketer) (born 1977), Indian cricketer
 Vishal O Sharma, Indian actor
 Vishal V. Sharma, Indian ambassador/permanent representative to UNESCO